Jerry Cook (born June 20, 1943) is a NASCAR modified championship race car driver.  He began racing at the age of 13 and won the track championship at Utica-Rome Speedway in 1969.

Racing career
He eventually went to become a six-time champion in the NASCAR Modified series (1971–72, 1974–77). His rivalry with fellow Rome, New York driver Richie Evans is legendary. He retired after the 1982 season with 342 wins. He stayed with the sport, and helped shape the series.

In 1973, he attempted to qualify for the Daytona 500 in a No. 07 Chevrolet. In his Daytona 500 Qualifying Race, he spun on lap 44 and finished 25th, failing to make the 500.

NASCAR administration
Cook served as the Whelen Modified Series' director when it began in 1985, and is currently NASCAR's Competition Administrator.

Awards
Inducted in the International Motorsports Hall of Fame in 2009
In 1989, he was inducted into the National Motorsports Press Association Hall of Fame
Inducted into the New York State Stock Car Association Hall of Fame in 1993
As part of NASCAR's 50th Anniversary celebration in 1998, he was named one of NASCAR's 50 Greatest Drivers.
NASCAR named him #3 on its NASCAR Modified All-Time Top 10 list.
Inducted into the NASCAR Hall of Fame in 2016
Inducted in the Northeast Dirt Modified Hall of Fame inducted in 2011.

Motorsports career results

NASCAR
(key) (Bold – Pole position awarded by qualifying time. Italics – Pole position earned by points standings or practice time. * – Most laps led.)

Winston Cup Series

Daytona 500

References

External links
 

1943 births
Living people
NASCAR drivers
People from Lockport, New York
Racing drivers from New York (state)
Sportspeople from Rome, New York

NASCAR Hall of Fame inductees